The Rensumaborg is a borg in the village of Uithuizermeeden in Groningen in the Netherlands.

References

Borgs in Groningen (province)
Rijksmonuments in Groningen (province)
Het Hogeland